Saori Takahashi (高橋 沙織 Takahashi Saori, born December 9, 1992) is a Japanese volleyball player who plays for Hitachi Rivale. She also plays for the All-Japan women's volleyball team.

Takahashi played for the All-Japan team for the first time at the Montreux Volley Masters in June 2013.

Clubs
  Waga-higashi Junior High
  Morioka girls Highschool
  Hitachi Rivale (2011-)

Awards

Individuals
2013 - V.Challenge League Excellent player award

Clubs
2012-2013 V.Challenge League -  Runner-Up, with Hitachi Rivale

References

External links
 V.League - Profile

Japanese women's volleyball players
Living people
1992 births
People from Iwate Prefecture
Volleyball players at the 2014 Asian Games
Asian Games competitors for Japan